"Marlene" is the first single from British artist Lightspeed Champion's second album Life is Sweet! Nice to Meet You, released on 25 January 2010.

Music video
A preview of the music video was posted on the Domino Records' YouTube channel on 3 November 2009, which was then followed a month later on 3 December 2009, by the full-length video.

It features Dev Hynes sitting in the back of a pick-up truck in a mountainous area, before the truck driver stops to pull Dev out of the truck and kick him down to the floor. This leads Dev into a psychedelic dream of dancing girls, only to wake up and find himself having an argument in a cafe with what appears to be his girlfriend. He soon wakes up from this to the truck driver throwing water at him, who then drags Dev to see two dancing girls similar to those in his dream. This sends him into another psychedelic dream. He then wakes up one more time in the back of the pick-up truck with the dancing girls in the distance, as if none of it had happened.

Track listing

References

External links
Official Lightspeed Champion Website

2010 singles
Songs written by Dev Hynes
2010 songs
Domino Recording Company singles